Sharon Fichman and Anastasia Pavlyuchenkova were the defending champions, but did not participate in the juniors that year.

Ksenia Milevskaya and Urszula Radwańska won the title, defeating Sorana Cîrstea and Alexa Glatch in the final, 6-1, 6-4.

Seeds

  Madison Brengle /  Julia Cohen (first round)
  Ksenia Lykina /  Anastasia Pivovarova (second round)
  Ksenia Milevskaya /  Urszula Radwańska (champions)
  Evgeniya Rodina /  Arina Rodionova (first round)
  Khrystyna Antoniychuk /  Ksenia Pervak (second round)
  Julia Glushko /  Oksana Kalashnikova (first round)
  Klaudia Boczová /  Kristína Kučová (quarterfinals)
  Mallory Cecil /  Ling Zhang (first round)

Draw

Finals

Top half

Section 1

Section 2

Bottom half

Section 3

Section 4

External links
 Draw

Girls' Doubles
French Open, 2007 Girls' Doubles